The running bowline is a knot consisting of a bowline looped around its own standing end to create a noose. 

The running bowline is strong and secure. It slides easily and can be undone just as simply.

Tying 
Tie a bowline in the end of a line with a small loop, and by appearance one then passes the standing part through the loop to form the noose. However, this method of forming the noose is practicable only for a short piece of line.  Alternatively, one can tie the bowline tied directly around the standing part or, having tied the bowline first, one would form a bight in the standing part and pull it through the loop of the bowline.

References